The Andorran Adapted Sports Federation (FADEA) is the National Paralympic Committee in Andorra for the Paralympic Games movement. It is a non-profit organisation that selects teams, and raises funds to send Andorran competitors to Paralympic events organised by the International Paralympic Committee (IPC).

The organization is based in Ordino.  The organization's president is Jordi Casellas.

See also
Andorra at the Paralympics

References

External links
Official website

Andorra
Andorra at the Paralympics
Pa
Disability organisations based in Andorra